Marcia Ella-Duncan OAM (born 1963) is a former Australian netball player. She became the first  Indigenous netballer to represent the Australian Diamonds.

Personal
Ella was born in 1963 in La Perouse, a suburb of Sydney. She is a descendant of the Yuin nation. Her parents moved to Sydney from South Coast, New South Wales.She was the ninth of twelve children. Three brothers - Mark, Glenn and Gary represented the Wallabies.She attended schools in La Perouse and Matraville. She retired from representative netball at 26 after marrying rugby league player Phil Duncan and having her first child. She has two daughters - Lauren and Maddison.

After retiring from netball, Ella-Duncan has been involved in numerous Indigenous Australian issues criminal justice, family and child well-being, community development and land management.

Netball
Ella represented New South Wales (NSW) at eleven and then selected in NSW 16 Schoolgirls and then NSW U21 teams. She started off as a goal defence but then moved to play centre. In 1983, Ella took up a netball scholarship at the Australian Institute of Sport (AIS) and became the first indigenous Australian to take up an AIS scholarship. From 1983 to 1985, she held an AIS netball scholarship. Between 1984 to 1987, she was regular member of NSW State Team. 

Ella became the became the first indigenous Australian Aboriginal to represent Australian Diamonds when she played against the Silver Ferns on 3 May 1986 in Christchurch. She was a member of the Australian Diamonds in 1986 and 1987 and this included winning a silver medal at the 1987 Netball World Cup in Glasgow, Scotland. She represented the Australian Diamonds 18 times.

Recognition
 1988 - Order of Australia Medal for services to netball
 2015 - Australian Netball Hall of Fame
 Aboriginal and Islander Sports Hall of Fame
 Photographic Portrait held by the National Portrait Gallery of Australia.

References

External links
 Netball Australia Hall of Fame induction

Living people
1963 births
Netball players from Sydney
Indigenous Australian netball players
Recipients of the Medal of the Order of Australia
Australia international netball players
Australian Institute of Sport netball players
1987 World Netball Championships players